"What Is Truth" is a song written and recorded by American country music artist Johnny Cash released in February 1970.

Background
Johnny Cash's recording is generally viewed as a protest song, a rarity in country music at the time, its criticism of the Vietnam War and the generation gap made the song a major crossover hit. Cash played this song in front of Richard Nixon in the White House on April 17, 1970.

Chart performance
The song peaked at number 3 on the Billboard Hot Country Singles. It also became Cash's 12th top 40 single on the Hot 100 chart, peaking at number 19, and his second top 10 single on the Adult Contemporary chart, peaking at number 4. It also reached number one on the RPM Country Tracks chart in Canada, and number 21 on the UK Singles Chart.

References

1970 songs
1970 singles
Johnny Cash songs
Songs written by Johnny Cash
Columbia Records singles
Protest songs
American folk songs